KJNZ (103.5 FM) was a radio station broadcasting a Regional Mexican format. The station was licensed to Hereford, Texas, United States, and was owned by Hereford Broadcasting, LLC.

History
The station went on the air as KAUU on May 16, 1997. On June 9, 1997, the station changed its call sign to KHFD, and on December 4, 2004 to KJNZ.

The Federal Communications Commission cancelled the station's license on January 14, 2020, due to the station's licensee failing to respond to allegations that the station had been silent since at least October 2014.

References

External links

JNZ
Defunct radio stations in the United States
Radio stations established in 2001
2001 establishments in Texas
Radio stations disestablished in 2020
2020 disestablishments in Texas
JNZ